Vennela is a 2005 Telugu romantic comedy film written and directed by Deva Katta, starring Raja and Parvati Melton as well as Sharwanand and Ravi Varma. Vennela was well received among the young, urban audiences and south Indian students in USA mostly from Andhra Pradesh, and Telangana, India. 90% of the film was shot in Michigan, United States. The American university setting was shot at Wayne State University main campus in Detroit and Oakland University in Rochester. Only 10% of the film was shot at City College Hyderabad. The film grossed  5.3 crore at the box office. The film has a sequel Vennela 1½ (2012) made by Vennela Kishore.

Plot
Pavani (Parvati Melton) is an independent woman, who wants to pursue higher education in USA. She has been in a committed relationship with Ritesh (Sharvanand), her classmate and son of a millionaire. Ritesh was an intelligent and popular guy in college. He draws hostility, jealousy, and enmity with his college mate Sayeed (Ravi Varma), who was also interested in Pavani, albeit secretly. Sayeed introduces him to smoking, drinking and college politics. Ritesh loses himself in those activities which disappoints Pavani. She tries to make him responsible but fails. She decides to break up with him several times but is convinced to change her mind by him. At last she decides to break up and moves to United States to pursue higher education and to keep away from him.

While celebrating her upcoming departure to the USA with her friends, Pavani meets Naveen (Raja) and his friends, who happen to get admitted to the same college as hers. Naveen and his friends go through culture shock and the troubles faced in studying in the US and trying for a part-time job including an Indian restaurant owner, Pachadlla Paramanandam (Brahmanandam). Sayeed, also a student of the same university, is aware of Pavani’s strained relationship with Ritesh.

Sayeed tries to mess up with Pavani and Ritesh's life to satisfy his ego and provokes Ritesh by lying about Pavani's relationship with Naveen. As Naveen and Pavani become closer, Sayeed brings Ritesh to the USA on a student visa to sabotage their relationship. On the other hand, Ritesh's father tries to woo Pavani with the property that will be inherited by Ritesh upon her marriage to him. But Pavani rejects his dad's offer. Ritesh becomes hostile towards Pavani: he believes he was used and cheated on and that he is innocent.

Ritesh's dad advises him not to get involved with a woman like Pavani, who doesn't want anything to do with Ritesh. His father reminds him that he is lucky to be born in a wealthy family, get a good education, and could settle down with his dad's inherited property. However, Ritesh ignores his dad's advice.

The rest of the plot depicts situations that deal with Ritesh's agony at being rejected by Pavani and also on realising that he is a victim of Sayeed's scheme when he chances upon morphed images of Pavani. Subsequently Ritesh becomes psychotic. He kills Sayeed at the university campus and attacks Pavani and Naveen by hiding in their car while they return from work. Just as Ritesh shoots Naveen in the neck, the cops arrive with an ambulance and rescue Naveen and Pavani by shooting Ritesh to death. The film highlights situations that leads people like Ritesh, to dig their own graves by getting into bad company.

Cast
 Raja as Naveen
 Parvati Melton as Pavani
 Sharwanand as Ritesh
 Ravi Varma as Sayeed
 Brahmanandam as Pachadla Paramanandam / Paper Check
 Kishore as Khader Bhasha
 Madhu Reddiboina as Sunil
 Mohit as Pavan
 Paul Iafelice as Paul

Soundtrack

The soundtrack album was composed by Mahesh Shankar and released by Aalaap Music. The rights are now owned by Lahari Music. The lyrics were written by Deva Katta, with Ravi Varma collaborating on a single song, "Ningi Nela".

References

External links

2005 films
Indian romantic comedy films
2000s Telugu-language films
Films directed by Deva Katta
2005 romantic comedy films